The 3rd Siberian Army Corps was an Army corps in the Imperial Russian Army.

Composition
1905:
4th Siberian Rifle Division
7th Siberian Rifle Division
1914:
7th Siberian Rifle Division
8th Siberian Rifle Division

Part of
1st Manchurian Army: 1904-1906
10th Army: 1914 - 1916
4th Army: 1914
2nd Army: 1917

Corps of the Russian Empire